Pablo Sebastián Melgar Torino (born January 14, 1980) is a retired Guatemalan-Chilean football defender.

Club career
Before playing in Chile, Melgar played for local clubs Deportivo Zacapa, Antigua GFC, Aurora F.C., and Municipal, the latter from 2004 to 2007, during which time the club won five league titles in a row. He then left Municipal for Antofagasta but decided not to return to Chile after finding it hard to play football outside the capital, Santiago de Chile. After a stint with USAC, Melgar returned to Municipal for the Apertura 2010 season.

International career
Melgar has been a regular on the Guatemala national team, for which he has competed at the youth, Olympic, and full international levels. Tournaments in which he partaked include the under-17 and under-20 World Cup qualifying, the 1999 Pan American Games, the 2000 Olympic tournament qualifying and the Central American Games of 2002.

He made his senior debut in a January 2002 friendly match against Cuba and has earned a total of 56 caps (including a non official game against Argentina), scoring 1 goal. He has represented his country in 16 FIFA World Cup qualification matches and played at the 2003 UNCAF Nations Cup and the 2005 and 2007 CONCACAF Gold Cups.

Personal life
Melgar is the son of the former Guatemala international footballer Armando Melgar and the older brother of the also former footballer Javier Melgar.

From his maternal line, Pablo and Javier are the grandsons of the Chilean former footballer and manager Rolando Torino. Due to his Chilean heritage, they naturalized Chilean by descent.

References

External links

1980 births
Living people
Sportspeople from Guatemala City
Citizens of Chile through descent
Guatemalan footballers
Sportspeople of Chilean descent
Guatemalan expatriate footballers
Guatemala international footballers
2002 CONCACAF Gold Cup players
2003 UNCAF Nations Cup players
2005 CONCACAF Gold Cup players
2007 CONCACAF Gold Cup players
Pan American Games competitors for Guatemala
Footballers at the 1999 Pan American Games
Aurora F.C. players
C.S.D. Municipal players
C.D. Suchitepéquez players
C.D. Antofagasta footballers
Antigua GFC players
Chilean Primera División players
Naturalized citizens of Chile
Guatemalan expatriate sportspeople in Paraguay
Guatemalan expatriate sportspeople in Chile
Expatriate footballers in Paraguay
Expatriate footballers in Chile
Association football central defenders